La Tranclière is a commune in the Ain department in eastern France.

Population

See also
Communes of the Ain department
Dombes

References

Communes of Ain
Ain communes articles needing translation from French Wikipedia